Gordius balticus is a species of horsehair worm belonging to the genus Gordius.

It is native to Estonia.

References

Nematomorpha
Environment of Estonia